Normington may refer to:

Wynn Normington Hugh-Jones (1923–2019), former British diplomat, administrator and Liberal Party official
David Normington, the First Civil Service Commissioner and Commissioner for Public Appointments for the British government
Grant Normington (born 1990), English footballer who is currently playing for Non-League side Hall Road Rangers
John Normington (1937–2007), English actor who appeared widely on British television from the 1960s until the year of his death